"Anyway, Anyhow, Anywhere" was the second single released by the English rock band the Who in 1965. It features call-and-response lyrics (especially common in Who lyrics at this time) and  some of the first ever recorded guitar feedback. The song was composed by lead singer Roger Daltrey and guitarist Pete Townshend, the only time they wrote together. The guitar feedback, although not the first to be heard on a record (see the Beatles' "I Feel Fine"), is thought to be the first solo with feedback. This is the first Who release with Nicky Hopkins playing piano.

Overview

Composition 
"Anyway, Anyhow, Anywhere" has a significant similarity to "Out in the Street", which appears on their debut album My Generation. Both songs feature a three-chord strum before "blasting into an uptempo rhythm"; Despite this, "Out in the Street" is a marginally older song, and both tracks originate from the same recording sessions between 13 and 14 April 1965. The use of feedback throughout the song was crucial, according to Townshend, who stated that the group "were trying to achieve the sound which we get on the stage at present, all in a commercial song that will sell." He would later claim that "Anyway, Anyhow, Anywhere" was an attempt to write a very spiritual song.

Brett Milano of udiscovermusic.com rated Townsend's guitar solo as one of the 100 all-time greatest, "cramming all kinds of great noises – guitar feedback, air-raid sirens, and good old guitar destruction – into the brief space he had."

Release 
"Anyway, Anyhow, Anywhere" was released on 21 May 1965. The release coincided with an appearance on Ready Steady Go! by the group, in which they perform this and "Shout and Shimmy". "Anyway, Anyhow, Anywhere" fitted the mood of Ready Steady Go! so well that the show adapted it as their intro for a while. In the US, the feedback present in the recording startled Decca Records, who believed they'd received a faulty tape of the song. The song was released on 5 June 1965 in the US.

The single became the Who's second top-ten single after "I Can't Explain", reaching number ten on the UK Singles Chart. It remained in the top forty for eleven weeks, with six weeks in the top twenty, and one in the top ten. It also became a top forty single in France, reaching number thirty-eight, but it failed to match the success that "I Can't Explain" had in the US: whereas that was a top-hundred hit (peaking at 93), "Anyway, Anyhow, Anywhere" failed to chart on the Billboard Hot 100. It sold approximately eighty-eight thousand copies in the UK.

Cash Box felt that the "middle instrumental section is a wow."

The song was rarely played live for most of the Who's career past 1965, but since 1999 has become a staple for their live shows; it appears on the album Live at the Royal Albert Hall.  It can also be found on BBC Sessions and The Kids Are Alright.

B-sides 
When first released in the UK, "Anyway, Anyhow, Anywhere" featured the B-side "Daddy Rolling Stone", a cover of blues-singer Otis Blackwell's debut B-side from 1953. Upon release in the US on 5 June 1965, it was replaced by a cover of the Garnet Mimms ballad "Anytime You Want Me". Both songs were included on the 2002 reissue of My Generation.

Personnel 
The Who

 Roger Daltrey – lead vocals
 Pete Townshend – electric guitar, backing vocals
 John Entwistle – bass guitar, backing vocals
 Keith Moon – drums

Additional musician

 Nicky Hopkins – piano

Other versions
David Bowie recorded a version of this song for his Pin Ups album in 1973.

The Flaming Lips recorded a version of this song which appeared on a Mojo magazine CD of Who covers called Mojo: The Who Covered.

A version of this song has also been recorded by Ocean Colour Scene for the Who tribute album Substitute – The Songs of The Who.

References

1965 singles
The Who songs
Song recordings produced by Shel Talmy
Songs written by Pete Townshend
1965 songs
Songs written by Roger Daltrey
Brunswick Records singles